George Thorneloe (4 October 1848 – 3 August 1935) was a Canadian Anglican bishop at the end of the 19th century and the beginning of the  20th.

Biography
Thorneloe was born in Coventry, England on October 4, 1848. He emigrated to Canada alongside his parents in 1858. His father was a Wesleyan Methodist minister, who was later ordained in the Anglican Church.  In 1875 Thorneloe married Marry Fuller, who we went on to have  two children with.

Throneloe was educated at Bishop's College, Lennoxville where he graduated with a First Class in Classics and won the Prince of Wales Medal.  He was ordained in 1874 by Bishop Williams. He was a missionary at Stanstead in Quebec Province until 1885 when he became Rector of St Peter's Sherbrooke. While at St. Peter's Thorneloe was made a canon of the Cathedral of the Holy Trinity, Quebec City. He was almost elected as Bishop of Quebec and Bishop of the Diocese of New Westminster, British Columbia. 

In 1896 he was elected as the third Bishop of Algoma. He was consecrated as Bishop on January 6, 1897 in the Cathedral of the Holy Trinity, Quebec City by Bishop Bond of Montreal.  In 1915 he also became Metropolitan of Ontario and Archbishop of Algoma. Throneloe held is positions as Bishop and Metropolitan until he resigned in 1927 due to ill health.  

Thorneloe died on 3 August 1935. A memorial service was held for him at St. Luke's Anglican Pro-Cathedral in Sault Ste. Marie, Ontario.  He was buried in Malvern Cemetery, Lennoxville, Quebec. A limestone baptismal font in the bapitistry of St. Luke's Cathedral memorializes the work of Thorneloe.

Awards and honors
Thorneloe's work was recognized in numerous ways including: 
 Bishop's University bestowed an honorary Doctorate of Divinity degree on him in 1896.
 Trinity College, Toronto honored Thorneloe with a Degree honoris causa in 1898. 
 In 1920 he received a second honorary Doctor of Divinity degree from the University of Oxford
 Thorneloe University an affiliated college at Laurentian University in Greater Sudbury is named after him.
 A village in rural Ontario is named after him.

External links 
 Archbishop George Thorneloe fonds, Anglican Diocese of Algoma Archives at Algoma University

References

1872 births
People from Coventry
Bishop's University alumni
Anglican bishops of Algoma
20th-century Anglican Church of Canada bishops
Metropolitans of Ontario
20th-century Anglican archbishops
1935 deaths
19th-century Anglican Church of Canada bishops